Maria Korovina (born 1962) is a Russian mathematician, Professor, Dr. Sc., a professor at the Faculty of Computer Science at the Moscow State University.

She defended the thesis «Elliptic problems in spaces with asymptotics and their applications to the construction of self-adjoint extensions of the Laplace operator» for the degree of Doctor of Physical and Mathematical Sciences (1992).

The author of the monograph «The theory of functional spaces and differential equations» (2007) and more than 70 scientific articles.

References

Bibliography

External links
 Scientific works of Maria Korovina
 Scientific works of Maria Korovina

Russian computer scientists
Russian women computer scientists
Russian mathematicians
Living people
1962 births
Academic staff of Moscow State University
Moscow State University alumni